The Najiehe Railway Bridge is a steel arch bridge in central Guizhou, China. The bridge crosses the Sancha River between Zhijin in Bijie and Qingzhen in Guiyang. The bridge is part of the new Lindai-Zhijin Railway line between Zhijin County and Guiyang.

Although the Najiehe Railway Bridge is officially 310 metres high, the bridge crosses over the reservoir created by the Dongfeng Dam and is only 285 meters high when the reservoir is at full water level.

See also
List of highest bridges in the world
List of longest arch bridge spans

External links
 http://www.highestbridges.com/wiki/index.php?title=Najiehe_Railway_Bridge

References

Bridges in Guizhou
Arch bridges in China
Buildings and structures under construction in China